Madrona Valley is a predominantly residential neighborhood in Seattle south of Madison Valley, west of Madrona, north of the Central District, and east of Cherry Hill.  Madrona Valley is one of Seattle's fastest gentrifying neighborhoods.

References